Neaspasia is a genus of moths belonging to the family Tortricidae.

Species
Neaspasia brevibasana  (Walsingham, 1891)
Neaspasia brevisecta  (Meyrick, 1930)
Neaspasia coronana  Aarvik, 2014
Neaspasia homalota  (Razowski, 1995)
Neaspasia karischi  Aarvik, 2014
Neaspasia loxochlamys Diakonoff, 1989
Neaspasia malamigambo  Aarvik, 2014
Neaspasia orthacta  (Meyrick, 1908)

See also
List of Tortricidae genera

References

External links
tortricidae.com

Tortricidae genera
Olethreutinae
Taxa named by Alexey Diakonoff